Gordina is a rural locality (a village) in Beloyevskoye Rural Settlement, Kudymkarsky District, Perm Krai, Russia. The population was 2 as of 2010.

Geography 
Gordina is located 24 km northwest of Kudymkar (the district's administrative centre) by road. Shadrina is the nearest rural locality.

References 

Rural localities in Kudymkarsky District